Xenocalamus mechowii, or the elongate quill-snouted snake, is a species of venomous rear-fanged snake in the subfamily Aparallactinae of the family Atractaspididae. The species is endemic to Africa.

Etymology
The specific name or epithet, mechowii, is in honor of Friedrich Wilhelm Alexander von Mechow, a Silesian-German explorer of Africa.

Geographic range
X. mechowii is found in Angola, Botswana, Republic of the Congo, Democratic Republic of the Congo, Namibia, Zambia, and Zimbabwe.

Habitat
The preferred habitat of X. mechowii is Kalahari sand.

Description
Dorsally, X. mechowii is yellowish with brown spots, some spots arranged in alternating confluent pairs, others forming crossbands. The upper lip, sides of the body, and venter are unspotted.

The species exhibits sexual dimorphism. Females are larger, and may attain  SVL.

The dorsal scales are smooth, without apical pits, arranged in 17 rows. The ventrals number 229-239. The anal plate is divided, and the subcaudals which number 31-36 are also divided.

The head scalation is the same as Xenocalamus bicolor, except there are no supraoculars and two postoculars.

The snout is very depressed and very prominent.

Diet
X. mechowii preys on amphisbaenians, which it finds by burrowing.

Reproduction
X. mechowii is oviparous. An adult female may lay a clutch of as many as four eggs.

Subspecies
Two subspecies are recognized including the nominate race.

Xenocalamus mechowii inornatus 
Xenocalamus mechowii mechowii 

Intergrades of these two subspecies can be found in North-Western Province, Zambia.

Footnotes

References
Peters WCH (1881). "Zwei neue von Herrn Major von Mechow während seiner letzten Expedition nach West-Afrika entdeckte Schlangen und eine Übersicht der von ihn mitgebrachten herpetologischen Sammlung ". Sitzunsber. Ges. naturf. Freunde Berlin 1881 (9): 147-150. (Xenocalamus mechowii, new species, p. 147). (in German).
de Witte GF, Laurent RF (1947). "Revision d'un groupe de Colubridae africains: genres Calamelaps, Miodon, Aparallactus, et formes affines ". Mém. Mus. Roy. Hist. Nat. Belgique (sér. 2) 29: 1-134. (Xenocalamus mechowii inornatus, new subspecies, p. 51). (in French).

External Links
iNaturalist page

Atractaspididae
Reptiles described in 1881
Taxa named by Wilhelm Peters